Among "Boston's most prolific DIY venues," the Whitehaus was a non-traditional performance venue and artists collective located in an eight-bedroom home at 10 Seaverns Ave. in Jamaica Plain, Massachusetts.  Music and poetry made by "the hyper-prolific Whitehaus collective" is distributed under The Whitehaus Family Record independent music label.  As described by one source: One of the most prolific new DIY collectives in Jamaica Plain, the Whitehaus Family Record, brings together folk, indie, and experimental sound to produce a psychedelic world of music, love, and all that other punk/hippie crossover goodness.
Their frequent "hootenannies" were open to anyone to share their musical or poetic talents.

The Whitehaus was to shut down in early 2013 after losing its lease on the house.

References

Social centres in the United States
Culture of Boston
Music venues in Massachusetts
Buildings and structures in Boston